Abraham Lincoln Neiman (July 4, 1875 — October 21, 1970) was an American businessman, who was a co-founder of department store chain Neiman Marcus.

Biography
Neiman, born in July 1875, was raised in a Jewish orphanage in Cleveland, Ohio. He met his first wife Carrie Marcus Neiman in Dallas, Texas, while they were working at A. Harris & Company. They married in 1905 and then moved to Atlanta, Georgia, with Carrie's brother Herbert Marcus and sister in law Minnie Lichtenstein Marcus to do sales promotion work.  

The Coca-Cola Company is known as their most notable client although at the time they were not enthusiastic about its future. Therefore, they relinquished rights to sales territories of the nascent soft drink concern for $25,000 which the Neiman and Marcus families used to open Neiman Marcus in Dallas in 1907.

Abraham became the broker and promoter for the specialty ready-to-wear ladies fine clothing shop. At the time most ladies of means traveled to New York City and even Europe for custom tailoring. He traveled widely as well to insure that Neiman Marcus could bring the best clothing money could buy to Dallas from New York and wherever else it could be found. 

When the store burned down in 1913 New York investors he knew helped to rebuild it. In the 1920s his nephew Stanley Marcus left Harvard Business School to work at Neiman Marcus and their personalities often clashed which added to the tensions he already felt with the large and successful Marcus family. In 1928 he admitted to ongoing infidelity to his wife Carrie so they divorced and Herbert bought out his share for $250,000 on the condition that he couldn't legally compete with Neiman Marcus in Dallas.

During the remainder of his life he often lived in New York and Chicago and he worked at companies such as Henry C. Lytton's of Chicago. He married Dorothy Squire, a fashion model, in 1938 and they adopted World War II refugees Diana and Ursula Woolf after discovering they were unable to have their own children. As he aged he became ever more well known for extravagant spending habits while at the same time he developed a reputation for sloppy business practices. Dorothy died of cancer suddenly in 1962 and Abraham, now penniless, returned to Dallas. His ex-nephew Stanley visited him out of fears that few others would before his death at a Masonic home in Arlington, Texas, in October 1970.

References

1875 births
1970 deaths
American Jews
American businesspeople in retailing
Jews and Judaism in Dallas